Edward Albert Lawrence (26 January 1896 – 21 May 1961) was a Canadian middle-distance runner. He competed in the men's 1500 metres at the 1920 Summer Olympics.

References

1896 births
1961 deaths
Athletes (track and field) at the 1920 Summer Olympics
Canadian male middle-distance runners
Canadian male long-distance runners
Olympic track and field athletes of Canada
English emigrants to Canada
Athletes from London